The 2006–07 Oddset Ligaen season was the 50th season of ice hockey in Denmark. Nine teams participated in the league, and the Herning Blue Fox won the championship.

Regular season

Playoffs

External links
Season on Hockeyarchives.info

Dan
2006 in Danish sport
2007 in Danish sport